Saïd Hamrani (born February 26, 1962, in Boghni) is a former Algerian international footballer.

On October 29, 1988, Hamrani made his international debut for Algeria in a friendly against Angola, scoring a goal on his debut in a 1-1 draw. In total, he won 4 caps for Algeria, scoring 1 goal.

References

1962 births
Algeria international footballers
Algerian footballers
JS Bordj Ménaïel players
JS Kabylie players
Kabyle people
Living people
People from Boghni
Association footballers not categorized by position
21st-century Algerian people